Cinta Pérez Cascales is a Spanish former footballer who played as a goalkeeper for Estudiantes Huelva and Sporting Huelva in Spain's Primera División.

Career

Pérez played for Sporting Huelva since the foundation of the club and was part of the team involved in their promotion to the top tier, the Primera División. In October 2011, she retired from football to join the Spanish Air Force.

References

1985 births
Living people
Spanish women's footballers
Sporting de Huelva players
Primera División (women) players
Women's association football goalkeepers
Footballers from Huelva